The 1919 Central Michigan Normalites football team represented Central Michigan Normal School, later renamed Central Michigan University, as an independent during the 1919 college football season. The Central Michigan football team compiled a 2–2–3 record and were outscored by their opponents by a combined total of 89 to 88. The team's victories were against Ferris State (7–0) and Bay City Western High School (34–6), the losses were against the Michigan Agricultural frosh team (6–14) and Detroit City College (14–42), and the ties were with Saginaw East High School (13–13), Grand Rapids Junior College (7–7), and the 1919 Michigan State Normal Normalites football team (7–7).

Garland Nevitt was hired as the school's head football coach in March 1919. He was an alumnus of Carlisle Indian Industrial School where he played with Jim Thorpe; he had been the football coach at the Mount Pleasant Indian School for three years before being hired by Central Normal.

Schedule

References

Central Michigan
Central Michigan Chippewas football seasons
Central Michigan Normalites football